Productos Naturales de la Sabana S.A.S., doing business as Alquería, is a Colombian company that produces food, especially dairy products and beverages. Founded between 1958 and 1959, it currently has 7 processing plants and 21 distribution centers throughout the country, making it one of the private companies with the highest purchase of milk and dairy products in Colombia. Alquería is a Spanish term that means "country house", it symbolizes the fresh products that originate from it.

References

External links 
  

Food and drink companies of Colombia
Food and drink companies established in 1958
Dairy products companies of Colombia
Colombian brands
1958 establishments in Colombia
Privately held companies